The NBA Skills Challenge (officially named The Taco Bell Skills Challenge), is a National Basketball Association (NBA) contest held on the Saturday before the annual All-Star Game as part of the All-Star Weekend. First held in 2003, it is a competition to test ball-handling, passing and shooting ability.

Until the 2022 edition, two participants raced against each other on identical courses by first dribbling between five obstacles while running down the court. Next, the player must throw a pass into an upright hoop. Then, the players must dribble back the full length of the court for a lay up. Shortly after, the players must dribble back down the court and hit a three pointer from the top of the basketball key. The match ends when the first player hits the three pointer. The champion was decided via a single elimination tournament format, with a guard and a frontcourt player guaranteed to face off in the final round. Frontcourt players were first allowed and invited to participate in 2016, and the event has since crowned centers and forwards as winners, beginning with Karl-Anthony Towns that year and followed by Kristaps Porziņģis in 2017, Bam Adebayo in 2020, and current champion Domantas Sabonis.

Since 2022, a new format was introduced. Under the new format, three teams will participate in a four-round competition. The first is a shooting round between. The second round is a passing challenge. The third round is a relay competition. The final round, between the two leading teams, is a half court shooting contest.

Winners

All-time participants

 The time is the all-time event record.
 Jameer Nelson was injured and was replaced by Mo Williams.
 Derrick Rose was injured and was replaced by Russell Westbrook.
 Stephen Curry was injured and was replaced by Rajon Rondo.
 For the  season, the NBA All-Star Weekend Skills Challenge was revamped to have 4 teams of two players compete to a two-round time relay-style course.
 John Wall was replaced by Patrick Beverley due to resting purposes.
 Michael Carter-Williams was replaced with his teammate Robert Covington due to injuries. Covington would be replaced by Elfrid Payton due to resting purposes.
 Jimmy Butler was replaced by Dennis Schröder due to a shoulder injury.
 Starting with the  season, the NBA All-Star Weekend Skills Challenge was revamped to a best of 8 tournament where after 8 players competed in the first round, only 4 would go to the semi-final round and 2 would participate in the championship round.
 Defending champion Patrick Beverley would be replaced by rookie Emmanuel Mudiay due to an ankle injury.
 Joel Embiid was replaced by Nikola Jokić due to a knee injury.
 Kristaps Porziņģis was replaced by Andre Drummond due to a torn ACL injury.
 Donovan Mitchell was replaced by Buddy Hield after Mitchell replaced Aaron Gordon for the Slam Dunk Contest.

Tournament Bracket (2015–2021)
Starting with the 2015 edition of the Skills Challenge, a tournament format was adopted.
2015

2016

2017

2018

2019

2020

2021

Sponsors

Notes

References

External links
2010 Skills Challenge
2009 Skills Challenge
2008 Skills Challenge
2007 Skills Challenge
2006 Skills Challenge
2005 Skills Challenge
2004 Skills Challenge

National Basketball Association All-Star Game
Recurring sporting events established in 2003
Taco Bell